During the 1962–63 season Walsall competed in the Football League Second Division where they finished in 21st position level on points with Charlton Athletic but had an inferior goal average and were relegated to the third tier.

Final league table

Second Division

Results

Legend

Football League Second Division

FA Cup

League Cup

References
 1962–63 Walsall season at Statto.com
 1962–63 Walsall season at Soccerway.com (use drop down list to select relevant season)

External links

Walsall F.C. seasons
Walsall